Holy Cross Cemetery, also known as Holy Cross Catholic Cemetery is an American Roman Catholic cemetery located in Menlo Park, California, established in the 1860s.

History 
The cemetery's oldest gravestone dates to 1860, the exact date of the cemetery formation is unknown. This had been a nonsectarian graveyard until the Catholic Church purchased it in 1872. 

The initial layout and landscaping of the cemetery was completed by Irish landscaper, Michael Lynch (1847–1918) who happens to also be buried at Holy Cross. Other notable projects of Lynch included the grounds of the Flood estate of Woodside; the Timothy Hopkins estate in Menlo Park; and he worked on Stanford University's landscaping. A section of the cemetery is made of only children's graves.

In 1953, the abandoned St. Dennis Cemetery of Menlo Park had their remains moved to Holy Cross, however only 24 of the 174 bodies were moved because the rest could not be found. In the 1950s and 1960s the cemetery was reconstructed under the leadership of John Kiefer and Edwin Kennedy.

Notable graves 

Many of the early pioneer families of the Bay Area are buried at this cemetery. Notable graves include the following:

 John Beltramo (1859–1948)
 Juana Briones de Miranda an early Californio, settling in what is modern-day San Francisco and Palo Alto.
Walter Jelich (1871–1949) and Mary Jelich (1880–1972)
 Elena Selby Atherton Macondray Selby (1845–1906), the child of Faxon Dean Atherton, and the widow of Frederick William Macondray Jr. (1803–1862), and Percival Walker Selby (1864–1924).
 Oscar Salvatierra (1935–2019) Stanford University doctor was that involved in the development and passage of the National Organ Transplant Act of 1984.
Jared Lawrence Rathbone (1844–1907) was the United States Consul General in Paris from 1887 to 1891.

References

External links
 

Cemeteries in San Mateo County, California
Roman Catholic cemeteries in California
Roman Catholic Archdiocese of San Francisco